Malanda Falls Conservation Park is located on the Malanda–Atherton Road, 1 km from Malanda, Queensland, on the Atherton Tableland, Australia.

The Park protects a small tropical rainforest remnant. The Malanda Falls, on the North Johnstone River, tumble over an ancient lava flow which originated from the Mount Hypipamee area, 15 km away.

See also 
 Malanda Falls Swimming Pool, the heritage-listed tourism development around the falls

References 

Protected areas of Far North Queensland